Rolando Burgoa Pablos (born September 26, 1967) is an American executive, attorney, and Republican politician from the U.S. state of Texas. He was sworn in as Secretary of State of Texas on January 5, 2017. On December 6, 2018, Pablos announced his resignation as Secretary of State effective December 15.

Background
Born in Sonora, Mexico, Pablos grew up in Ciudad Juárez, Chihuahua, and El Paso, Texas. He graduated from Cathedral High School in El Paso.

Education 
In 1992, he graduated from St. Mary's University in San Antonio, Texas, with a bachelor's degree in biology. He then earned a Master of Business Administration from the University of Texas at San Antonio, a master's in Hospitality Management from the Hilton College of Hotel and Restaurant Management at the University of Houston, and in 1998 a Juris Doctor from St. Mary's University School of Law.

Pablos was described as the "driving force" behind the creation of the San Antonio campus of Hilton College, at which he formerly served as adjunct lecturer of hospitality law.

Career
Pablos formerly served as a Texas Public Utility Commissioner and then chaired the Texas Racing Commission. He was nominated to serve as Texas Secretary of State by Republican Governor Greg Abbott and confirmed by the Texas Senate on February 14, 2017.

In March 2017, Pablos made his first international diplomatic mission to Mexico City, during which he affirmed the strong economic relationship between Texas and Mexico. After the trip, Pablos said he was "highly encouraged" by his meetings and discussions with both private and public sector officials, including representatives from the SENER, Mexico's energy ministry.

Pablos co-founded Uriel Americas and served as chief executive officer of the Borderplex Alliance, a bi-national economic developmental corporation.

In August 2017, as a new school year loomed, Pablos urged high school principals to register qualified students for voting. The principals, noted Pablos, are required under the state election code to serve as deputy voter registrars, in which capacity they are expected to distribute voter registration applications to students who will turn eighteen by election day.

Writing in World Oil magazine in November 2017, Pablos expressed optimism that Mexico's energy reforms enacted in 2013 would provide Texas and Mexico "a new opportunity" to collaborate in cross-border energy trade, through what he calls the "Texas-Mexico Energy Nexus," adding that "the potential is enormous for Texas energy leaders to expand in a newly privatized Mexican energy market." Pablos had made cross-border energy integration the focus of a Texas Border Trade Advisory Committee meeting earlier that year.

In March 2018, Pablos welcomed Aga Khan IV to Texas during his Diamond jubilee visit to the United States.

References

1967 births
21st-century American politicians
American politicians of Mexican descent
Living people
People from Ciudad Juárez
People from El Paso, Texas
People from Travis County, Texas
Secretaries of State of Texas
Texas Republicans
Mexican emigrants to the United States
St. Mary's University, Texas alumni
University of Texas at San Antonio alumni
University of Houston alumni
Politicians from Sonora